William Carlyle Darnall (born April 21, 1944) is an American former football wide receiver who played in the National Football League (NFL) for 2 seasons for the Miami Dolphins. Darnall appeared in 13 career games.

References

living people
1944 births
American football wide receivers
North Carolina Tar Heels football players
Miami Dolphins players
Players of American football from Washington, D.C.